Malta Independent School District is a public school district based in the community of Malta, Texas (USA).

The district has one school that serves students in grades pre-kindergarten through eight.

In 2009, the school district was rated "recognized" by the Texas Education Agency.

The district changed to a four day school week in fall 2022.

References

External links
Malta ISD

School districts in Bowie County, Texas